Bintry Watermill is located on the River Wensum, about a mile (2 km) west of the village of Bintree in the English county of Norfolk. The watermill is thought to have stood at this location since 1454. The present mill is thought to date from the 1750s

Description
The present building is built from red Norfolk brick over four storeys in three bays to the south-west elevation. There are two columns of windows to the north-west elevation. The lower two stories of the mill date from the 18th century with the top floor being added sometime in the 19th century. On the western end of the mill there is a timber lucam (covered sack hoist) of shiplap construction. The wheelrace still runs below the mill but the wheel was removed in 1947 to provide additional space for electrically powered machinery. Across the road there is a bridge, with dentilled cornice, from which the wheelrace discharged back into the river. The corner of the building is cut away where road curves round the gable.

Millers cottage
To the east side of the mill is attached the millers cottage which has a chequered patterned brick gable end. The cottage has a Georgian doorcase. Sometime in the 19th century the roof was raised to include two dormers.

Film set
The watermill at Bintry was used in 1996 by the BBC for location work on their adaptation of George Eliot’s The Mill on the Floss which was aired on 1 January 1997 and starred Emily Watson as Maggie Tulliver and Mr Tulliver by Bernard Hill. It was also the location of a Campion episode, Sweet Danger, filmed in 1989.

References

External link

Watermills in Norfolk